Another's Wife (Spanish: La mujer de otro) is a 1967 Spanish drama film directed by Rafael Gil and starring Martha Hyer, Analía Gadé and John Ronane.

Cast
 Martha Hyer as Ana María  
 Analía Gadé  as Pepa  
 John Ronane as Andrés  
 Ángel del Pozo as Enrique  
 Elisa Ramírez as Alicia  
 Manuel Alexandre  as Policía  
 María Francés  
 Pastora Peña  
 Erasmo Pascual as Hombre del bar  
 Rafaela Aparicio as Mujer del bar  
 Rafael Hernández as Conductor de excavadora  
 Ángel de Andrés as Taxista  
 Ana María Noé 
 Alberto Dalbés  as Santiago  
 Fosco Giachetti  as Alberto 
 Inma de Santis as Ana María de niña

References

Bibliography 
 Bentley, Bernard. A Companion to Spanish Cinema. Boydell & Brewer 2008.

External links 
 

1967 drama films
Spanish drama films
1967 films
1960s Spanish-language films
Films directed by Rafael Gil
Films scored by Ernesto Halffter
1960s Spanish films